Who's Who Among American High School Students was a web site and publication (owned and managed by Educational Communications Inc.) that listed what it claimed were high school students "who have excelled in academics, extracurricular activities and community service." The website shut down in November 2007 due to the bankruptcy of its parent firm.

About
Who's Who Among American High School Students compiled and published an annual edition in which students' names and achievements are listed. According to the website, people who accept nomination for inclusion in the book are sometimes qualified for various scholarship opportunities. While there were no required fees to be considered, there was the optional purchase of the listing publication.

Who's Who Among American High School Students was one of three publications produced by Educational Communications, Inc. (ECI). ECI was part of American Achievement Corporation (AAC), located in Austin, Texas. AAC is one of 7 companies owned by Fenway Partners, based in New York City. ECI ceased operations on November 1, 2007.

Criticism
There was much debate over the value of the book. Although it does not cost any money to be listed, it is often categorized as a scam since it is an attempt by a private company to make money through proud parents and students who purchase the book and various memorabilia (such as a "commemorative keychain") associated with the publication in attempt at recognition. There have been concerns about how students are nominated as well as whether the listing's entries are fact-checked and accurate.

The focus of another criticism was the fact of some students being excluded, apparently based on highly random or subjective factors, while others were included. In contrast to such things as academic, athletic, artistic or citizenship awards, which are based at least partly on demonstrable merit, these vanity publications seemed highly influenced by biased recommendations from teachers or even imaginary achievements stated by students (for example, claiming to star in school plays that never existed). Another issue raised, particularly as regards private schools, is that publications of this kind serve to challenge the standards of (for example) a Roman Catholic institution which sets its own norms for students' success in areas beyond academics and activities.

While proud parents were asked to purchase books and pay additional fees to have photos included in the book, "Who's Who" did provide scholarships to a limited number of students yearly.  Photos were included of each scholarship winner at no cost to the parents and a copy of the book was provided for free to the family of each scholarship recipient.

Students consented to being listed in Who's Who in the hope that the listing would be seen by college admissions offices as a significant recognition of a student's academic and extracurricular involvement. However, most admissions officers believe that the recognition has no such value and in fact some consider the "honor" to be a joke. According to the admissions vice president of Hamline University, "It's honestly something that an admissions officer typically wouldn't consider or wouldn't play into an admissions decision," adding that Who's Who... is just trying to sell books.

See also
 Who's Who scam

References

External links
 10-K Filed Form for American Achievement Corporation (AAC)

High school honor societies
United States biographical dictionaries
2007 disestablishments in the United States